Vladimir Nikolayevich Janjgava (19 May 1907 – 10 April 1982) was a Georgian Soviet Army lieutenant general and Hero of the Soviet Union who participated in battles during the Winter War and was a specialist in infantry warfare during World War II. Janigava held command of various infantry regiments, divisions and corps of the Soviet Army. Janjgava served in a series of leadership roles after the war, including as Minister of Internal Affairs of Georgian SSR (1954—1958).

Early life
Vladimir Janjgava was born in the Georgian village of Gubi in May 1907. After graduating he entered the Red Army in 1927 and specialized in military warfare at the Transcaucasus Military-Infantry School in the capital city of Tbilisi. During his service in various Soviet Army formations during Pre-World War II, he rose through the ranks and participated in the Winter War as a junior officer.

World War II
In 1941, when the Great Patriotic War broke out, Janjgava, who had already reached the rank of colonel, took part in various defensive operations against German forces in Moldavia and Donets Basin. From March 1942 to April 1943 he commanded the 676th Rifle Regiment and was engaged in critical defensive operations in and around the city of Voronezh, as well as the 1st and 2nd Kastornoye operations, both being part of the greater Voronezh-Voroshilovgrad Strategic Defensive. In July 1943 he took command of the Soviet 15th Rifle Division and was responsible for leading the general infantry assault on the left flank of the Soviet armies during the Battle of Kursk.

From 1944 he led the 354th Rifle Division, which was successively part of the 1st and 2nd Belorussian Fronts, and participated in the liberation of Belorussia and Poland and, more importantly, the advance through East-Prussia and finally the attack on Berlin. At this point, major general Janjgava skillfully managed to divide the fronts at the Weichsel, Narew and Oder rivers. The division fought over a total distance of 1,000 kilometers, liberated Szczecin and participated in the liberation of a total of 20 other cities, before finally reaching Berlin. For outstanding performance and personal courage, Janjgava was awarded the title Hero of the Soviet Union and received various other decorations.

Post-war
In 1948, Janjgava graduated from the General Staff Academy and became a lieutenant general. From then, he took command of several army corps before returning to Georgia. He served as Minister of Internal Affairs of Georgian SSR from May 1954 to December 1958, and took active part is suppressing the 1956 Tbilisi Riots. Later, he worked as director of the military department of the Tbilisi State University. Later he also became the leader of the DOSAAF central committee in the Georgian SSR. Vladimir Janjgava died on 10 April 1982 at the age of 75. He was buried in a cemetery near Tbilisi.

References

1907 births
1982 deaths
Generals from Georgia (country)
People from Imereti
People from Kutais Governorate
People of World War II from Georgia (country)
Communist Party of the Soviet Union members
Military Academy of the General Staff of the Armed Forces of the Soviet Union alumni
Academic staff of Tbilisi State University
Second convocation members of the Supreme Soviet of the Soviet Union
Third convocation members of the Supreme Soviet of the Soviet Union
Fourth convocation members of the Supreme Soviet of the Soviet Union
Heroes of the Soviet Union
Recipients of the Order of the Cross of Grunwald, 3rd class
Recipients of the Order of Kutuzov, 2nd class
Recipients of the Order of Lenin
Recipients of the Order of the Red Banner
Recipients of the Order of the Red Banner of Labour
Recipients of the Order of the Red Star
Mingrelians
Soviet Georgian generals
Soviet lieutenant generals
Soviet military personnel of World War II